Nayef Himiedi Al-Fayez is a Jordanian minister and politician who holds the position of Minister of Tourism and Antiquities in Bishr Al-Khasawneh's government. He assumed the position on October 12, 2020, succeeding Majd Shweikeh.

Education 
Nayef Al-Fayez holds a MA in International Relations and a Bachelor of Political Science.

Career 
Nayef Al-Fayez held the position of Minister of Tourism and Antiquities and Minister of Environment (2012-2013), Minister of Tourism and Antiquities (2012), Director General of the Tourism Revitalization Authority, and worked as an advisor in the Cabinet, Administrative Director of the Dead Sea Institute project, and Director of Prince Faisal bin Al Hussein's office.

He held the position of Minister of Environment in the government of Omar Razzaz from June 14, 2018 until his departure from the government team in the first ministerial amendment on October 11, 2018 (less than 100 days after the formation of the government), and the position of Minister of Environment in Hani Al-Mulki's second government from (February 25, 2018 - June 14, 2018). 

Since taking office in 2020, Nayef Al-Fayez has been working to get the city of Al-Salt to be nominated as a UNESCO World Heritage site, and to secure funding to keep the country's tourism sector afloat during the Covid-19 pandemic; the ministry since the beginning of those efforts have raised and secured 20 million JOD (28.2 millions USD).

References 

Year of birth missing (living people)
Government ministers of Jordan
Brigham Young University alumni
Living people
Nayef